The Men's 1 metre springboard competition of the diving events at the 2015 World Aquatics Championships was held on 24 and 27 July 2015.

Results
The preliminary round was held on 24 July at 15:00. The final was held on 27 July at 15:00.

Green denotes finalists

References

Men's 1 metre springboard